Ripa Hits the Skids is a 1993 Finnish comedy film directed by Christian Lindblad. It was entered into the 18th Moscow International Film Festival. The film was selected as the Finnish entry for the Best Foreign Language Film at the 66th Academy Awards, but was not accepted as a nominee.

Cast
 Sam Huber as Ripa
 Mari Vainio as Tiina
 Merja Larivaara as Pirjo
 Leena Uotila as Irma
 Leo Raivio as Antti
 Kari Väänänen as Lynkkynen
 Jussi Lampi as Lindgren
 Vesa-Matti Loiri as Father
 Christian Lindblad as Keränen
 Minna Pirilä as Beauty
 Jukka Pitkänen as Jaatinen

See also
 List of submissions to the 66th Academy Awards for Best Foreign Language Film
 List of Finnish submissions for the Academy Award for Best Foreign Language Film

References

External links
 

1993 films
1993 comedy films
Finnish comedy films
1990s Finnish-language films